"Promises" is a song by Christian Contemporary-Alternative-Rock band Sanctus Real from their sixth studio album, Run. It was released on October 9, 2012, as the first single from the album.

Composition 
"Promises" was written by Mark Graalman, Matt Hammitt, Peter Prevost and Chris Rohman, who are all band members of Sanctus Real.

Release 
The song "Promises" was digitally released as the lead single from Run on October 9, 2012.

Charts

Weekly charts

Year-end charts

References 

2012 singles
Sanctus Real songs
2012 songs
Songs written by Matt Hammitt
Sparrow Records singles